Johannes "Johan/Jan" Boskamp (born 21 October 1948) is a Dutch former football player and manager.

He played the majority of his career for hometown club Feyenoord and Belgian side RWDM and managed primarily in the Belgian leagues. Currently he is a regular sports commentator on two Dutch and Belgian football television programs. He is commonly addressed as "Jan" in the Netherlands and "Johan" in Belgium.

Playing career

Club
His former clubs as a player include RVV HOV, Feyenoord Rotterdam, Holland Sport, R.W.D. Molenbeek (with whom he won the Belgian First Division in 1975), and Lierse. Boskamp was furthermore voted Belgian Golden Shoe winner in 1975.

International
He was part of the Dutch team for the 1978 FIFA World Cup, making one substitute appearance against Scotland. He also won the 1970 Intercontinental Cup, with Feyenoord.

Coaching career
Later Boskamp became a manager and coached Belgian clubs Lierse, Dender, Beveren, Kortrijk, Anderlecht, Gent. He then moved to Georgia in 1999 to manage Dinamo Tbilisi and also the Georgia national team. After a return to Belgium with Genk he moved to the Middle East and managed United Arab Emirates side Al Wasl and Kuwait club Kazma.

He became manager of English side Stoke City for the 2005–06 season. Stoke's Icelandic board wanted the club to start mounting a serious attempt at gaining promotion to the Premier League and so decided a change in style was required with Boskamp replacing Tony Pulis. He brought in a number of foreign players which included Carl Hoefkens, Hannes Sigurðsson, Junior N'Galula and Martin Kolář as well as domestic based players, Marlon Broomes, Paul Gallagher, Mamady Sidibe, Peter Sweeney and Luke Chadwick. He also broke the club record transfer fee with a £950,000 signing of Standard Liège striker Sambégou Bangoura. However results were often poor and after a number of heavy home defeats to Watford, Wolverhampton Wanderers and Cardiff City, and supporters began asking questions. Bangoura then went on a good run of form scoring seven goals in six matches as Stoke won six matches in November and December to give them a platform to build on going into the new year. But in one of those wins away at Coventry City Boskamp and his assistant Jan de Koning and director of football John Rudge were involved in an argument which led to Boskamp almost resigning.

Stoke began 2006 in terrible form winning just one match in ten and scoring a mere six goals in that time. Bangoura had been away on international duty with Guinea and failed to return to the club at the agreed date which caused the shortage of goals and with Stoke's season fizzling out with no chance of promotion Boskamp was not offered a new contract by Gunnar Gíslason. With the Icelandic board failing to gain promotion to the Premier League and with debts now at around £5million chairman Gunnar Gíslason put the club up for sale and he sold the club back to former chairman Peter Coates. Coates then re-appointed Tony Pulis as manager who had spent the season with Plymouth Argyle.

He was then briefly manager at Standard Liège in 2006. In November 2007 he became coach of another Belgian club: FCV Dender EH, on 19 May 2009 he quit Dender after an argument with his coaching assistant Patrick Asselman, who has been named new coach.

In June 2009, Boskamp signed with SK Beveren but was sacked in December 2009 after poor results.

Career statistics

Club
Source:

International
Source:

Managerial statistics

Honours

Player 
Feyenoord

 Eredivisie: 1968–69, 1970–71, 1973–74
 KNVB Cup: 1968-69
 Intercontinental Cup: 1970
 UEFA Cup: 1974
 Intertoto Cup: 1967, 1968, 1973

RWD Molenbeek

 Belgian First Division: 1974–75
 Jules Pappaert Cup: 1975
 Amsterdam Tournament: 1975

International

Netherlands 

FIFA World Cup: 1978 (runners-up)

Individual 

 Man of the Season (Belgian First Division): 1974-75, 1977-78
 Belgian Golden Shoe: 1975

Manager 
SK Beveren

 Second Division: 1990-91

RSC Anderlecht

 Belgian First Division: 1992–93, 1993–94, 1994–95

Dinamo Tbilisi

 Umaglesi Liga: 1998–99

Racing Genk

 Belgian Cup: 1999–2000

References

External links

 
Weltfussball profile 

Just who is Johan Boskamp?
Johan Boskamp trainer Stoke City

1948 births
Living people
Footballers from Rotterdam
Association football midfielders
Dutch footballers
Netherlands international footballers
1978 FIFA World Cup players
Feyenoord players
ADO Den Haag players
R.W.D. Molenbeek players
Lierse S.K. players
Eredivisie players
Belgian Pro League players
English Football League managers
Dutch expatriate footballers
Expatriate footballers in Belgium
Dutch expatriate sportspeople in Belgium
Dutch football managers
R.W.D. Molenbeek managers
Lierse S.K. managers
F.C.V. Dender E.H. managers
K.S.K. Beveren managers
K.V. Kortrijk managers
R.S.C. Anderlecht managers
K.A.A. Gent managers
FC Dinamo Tbilisi managers
Georgia national football team managers
K.R.C. Genk managers
Al-Wasl F.C. managers
Kazma SC managers
Stoke City F.C. managers
Standard Liège managers
Dutch expatriate football managers
Expatriate football managers in Belgium
Expatriate football managers in Georgia (country)
Expatriate football managers in the United Arab Emirates
Expatriate football managers in Kuwait
Expatriate football managers in England
Dutch expatriate sportspeople in Georgia (country)
Dutch expatriate sportspeople in the United Arab Emirates
Dutch expatriate sportspeople in Kuwait
Dutch expatriate sportspeople in England
Dutch association football commentators
UEFA Cup winning players
Kuwait Premier League managers